Stinking Bishop is a washed-rind cheese produced since 1972 by Charles Martell and Son at Hunts Court Farm, Dymock, Gloucestershire, in the west of England. It is made from the milk of Gloucester cattle.

History
By 1972, just 68 Gloucester breed heifers were left in the world. Charles Martell bought up many of the surviving cows, and began to produce cheese from their milk, not initially for its own sake, but to promote interest in the breed. Since then, his own herd has expanded to 25 cows, and with a revival of interest by other farmers, which has increased the total number of cows to around 450. The relatively small size of Martell's herd means that the Gloucester milk is combined and pasteurised with the milk of Friesian cattle from another farm nearby. The fat content is 48%.

The colour of Stinking Bishop ranges from white/yellow to beige, with an orange to grey rind. Only about 20 tonnes are produced each year.

The distinctive odour comes from the process with which the cheese is washed during its ripening; it is immersed in perry made from the local Stinking Bishop pear (from which the cheese gets its name) every four weeks while it matures. To increase the moisture content and to encourage bacterial activity, salt is not added until the cheese is removed from its mould.

Popular culture 
This cheese was brought to international attention thanks to Wallace & Gromit. In the 2005 animated film The Curse of the Were-Rabbit, Gromit uses it to revive Wallace. Demand for the cheese subsequently rose by 500%, forcing the cheesemaker to hire more staff and increase production. It was also referenced again at the end of Episode 4 of Wallace and Gromit's World of Invention, where Wallace samples an even more pungent variant of Stinking Bishop, called "Stinking Archbishop."

Chef Andrew Zimmern, host of the TV show Bizarre Foods (Travel Channel), tastes Stinking Bishop during a visit to Harrods in London. The show’s recap mentions other delicacies tasted by Andrew, but not the cheese; one has to watch the part where Andrew visits the famous department store, guided by marketing manager Andre Dange.

In the 2011 Channel 4 show King of..., hosted by Claudia Winkleman, Stinking Bishop was named as the King of Cheese by Winkleman and her two guests Chris Evans and Sarah Millican.

Availability 
Stinking Bishop is an artisanal, handmade cheese, so is not produced for supermarkets. It currently has over 130 stockists across the UK, and can be found in artisan food stores and delicatessens, as well as in Harrods and Selfridges.

Awards 
 2010, Gold Medal Winner at the British Cheese Awards

See also
Smoking Bishop
 List of British cheeses

References

External links
 
 

English cheeses
Cow's-milk cheeses
Washed-rind cheeses
Products introduced in 1972
Gloucestershire cuisine